Rock Harbor is the main access point for visitors landing on Isle Royale in northern Lake Superior. It sits  from the northeastern end of the  island, the whole of which is protected as Isle Royale National Park. Two structures in Rock Harbor—the Rock Harbor Light and the Edisen Fishery—are listed on the National Register of Historic Places.

The Rock Harbor name is properly applied to the  inlet from Moskey Basin to Scoville Point along the southern shore of the easterly part of Isle Royale.  This inlet is screened from the open waters of Lake Superior by a number of offshore islands, including Mott Island, the site of the park headquarters.

Travel to Rock Harbor from the Upper Peninsula of Michigan is by the Ranger III park service ferry, operating from Houghton, Michigan, the Isle Royale Queen IV out of Copper Harbor, Michigan, and seaplane service.  The Voyageur II operates out of Grand Portage, Minnesota; it circumnavigates the island with stops at Windigo Ranger Station in Washington Harbor on the west end of the island and other points along the shore.

The ferry boats land at Snug Harbor, which also has berths for private watercraft, a campground, the visitor center, and a lodge that predates the national park.

Rock Harbor is the eastern end and terminus of the Greenstone Ridge Trail.

Rock Harbor is also listed by the Geographic Names Information System as a populated place named Rock Harbor Lodge.  Although there is no permanent population, the area includes the Rock Harbor Lodge, restaurant, resorts, several boat docks, and campgrounds.  Rock Harbor also contained its own summer post office from 1924–1958.

References 

Isle Royale
Geography of Keweenaw County, Michigan
Coastal resorts in Michigan
Landmarks in Michigan
Tourist attractions in Keweenaw County, Michigan